Gaël Touya (born 23 October 1973) is a French fencer. He won a gold medal at the 2004 Summer Olympics in Athens, in team sabre, together with his brother Damien Touya and Julien Pillet.

References

External links

1973 births
Living people
French male sabre fencers
Olympic fencers of France
Olympic gold medalists for France
Fencers at the 2004 Summer Olympics
Olympic medalists in fencing
Medalists at the 2004 Summer Olympics
Universiade medalists in fencing
Universiade silver medalists for France